Quarantania I is an outdoor sculpture by Louise Bourgeois, installed at the Museum of Fine Arts, Houston's Lillie and Hugh Roy Cullen Sculpture Garden in the U.S. state of Texas. The bronze sculpture was designed during 1947–1953/1981 and cast in 1984.

See also

 List of artworks by Louise Bourgeois
 List of public art in Houston

References

20th-century sculptures
Bronze sculptures in Texas
Lillie and Hugh Roy Cullen Sculpture Garden